Nokian Tyres plc, headquartered in Nokia, Finland, produces tyres for cars, trucks, buses, and heavy-duty equipment. Known for its winter tyres, Nokian is the only tyre manufacturer in the world with its own permanent winter tyre testing facility. The company's Hakkapeliitta brand name is recognised in Finland as a reputable trademark.

Nokian Tyres concentrates on the consumer car and vehicle tyre replacement and premium snow tyre markets; they do not supply automobile manufacturers tyres for new car production. The greater prices consistently found in those markets result in higher profitability compared to the rest of the tyre industry. The company also produces retreading materials and tyre pressure monitors. It once manufactured bicycle tyres but now licenses the Nokian name on bicycle tyres to another Finnish company. The Vianor retail tyre store chain, which services cars in addition to selling tyres, is owned by Nokian Tyres PLC.

The company traces its history to a groundwood pulp mill established in 1865. Car tyre production began in 1932 by Suomen Gummitehdas Oy (Finnish Rubber Works Ltd). A three-company merger formed the Nokia Corporation in 1967; Nokian Tyres Limited was established in 1988 as a joint venture company split from the conglomerate as Nokia Corporation started focusing entirely on the mobile communications business. Nokian is "Nokia" in the genitive, thus Nokian renkaat meaning "Tyres of Nokia". The European subsidiary of Japanese tyre company Bridgestone is currently the largest minority shareholder.

History

Early corporate predecessors of Nokian Tyres are the Nokia Aktiebolag (Nokia Company) and Suomen Kumitehdas Oy (Finnish Rubber Works Ltd.). In 1865, mining engineer Fredrik Idestam established a groundwood pulp mill on the banks of the Tammerkoski rapids in the town of Tampere, in southwestern Finland. In 1871, with the help of his close friend, the statesman Leo Mechelin, Idestam renamed and transformed his mills into a share company, founding the Nokia Company.

Suomen Gummitehdas Oy was founded in 1898 and began manufacturing car tyres in 1932. The Hakkapeliitta tyre name was introduced in 1936, and some tyres sold under the Nokian tyre name still use the Hakkapeliitta brand name. Hakkapeliitta is a (Finnish) historical term used for a Finnish light cavalryman in the service of King Gustavus Adolphus of Sweden during the Thirty Years' War (1618–48). In 1967, Suomen Kumitehdas Oy (originally called Suomen Gummitehdas Oy, Finnish Rubber Works in English) merged with Kaapelitehdas (The Cable Company) and the forest and power industry company Nokia Aktiebolag to create Nokia Corporation.

Nokian Tyres (which had manufactured tyres under the Nokia brand; Nokian is the genitive) was split from the Nokia Corporation when Nokian Tyres Limited was created in 1988 as a joint venture company. Nokian Tyres PLC shares were floated on the Helsinki Stock Exchange (OMX Helsinki) in 1995. Nokia, which became the largest mobile telephone manufacturer in 1998, ended its ownership interest in Nokian Tyres in 2003, selling its holding of 2 million shares to Bridgestone Europe NV/SA, a subsidiary of the Japanese tyre manufacturer Bridgestone, for U.S. $73.2 million. This made Bridgestone the largest shareholder, with an 18.9% stake, later diluted to 16.8%. Bridgestone announced that Nokian Tyres would be operated independently, but it would consider complementing the company's product development, testing, and distribution.

Production of bicycle tyres and inner tubes started in 1974 in Lieksa, Finland. In 2004, Nokian Tyres sold its bicycle tyre business to Suomen Rengastehdas Oy for €3.6 million. This successor company remained one of the few manufacturers of tungsten carbide-studded snow tyres for bicycles. Suomen Rengastehdas continued to produce bicycle tyres, including all Nokian-branded bicycle tyres until the bankruptcy of the company on 20 May 2019 In September 2019 LieksaTyres Oy acquired the bankruptcy estates including all model and immaterial rights of Suomen Rengastehdas and continues the production of promising product categories including bicycle summer tyres.

Nokian Tyres set up a joint venture, Ordabasy – Nokian Tyres JSC, with Ordabasy Corporation JSC, a multi-industry Kazakh company, to manufacture passenger car tyres at a planned new factory in Kazakhstan. The venture started in 2007, but the manufacturing project was put on hold in early 2009. Nokian Tyres was to provide technical expertise in tyre manufacturing, and the products were to be sold in Kazakhstan, Central Asia, Russia, and Eastern Europe. In 2009, the Nokian Hakkapeliitta tyre model line received the "List of trademarks with a reputation" status by the National Board of Patents and Registration of Finland.

The 2022 Russian invasion of Ukraine had a severe impact on Nokian Tyres as the company had manufactured 80 percent of its car tyres in Russia. Nokian initially continued its operations in Russia, expressing that it wished to retain control over its factories and ensure they were not used for military purposes. It also said it would boost production in Finland and the United States. During the summer, Nokian began to withdraw from Russia. In October, Nokian sold its Russian operations to Tatneft for €400 million and announced a €650 million investment for a new factory in Romania.

Financial information

Nokian Tyres' three principal activities are the manufacture of passenger car tyres, heavy commercial tyres, and retail tyre sales. As of 2008, Nokian is the most profitable tyre manufacturer in the world, at up to 18% earnings (before taxes and interest) relative to sales, compared to 14% at Bridgestone, 8% at Michelin, and 9.6% at Continental.

In 2010, Nokian Tyres profits were €167.9 million on sales of €1.058 billion, an increase in revenues of 32.5% on the previous year. The company had revenue growth of 18% annually in the 2003–2007 period. Nokian Tyres is also publicly traded on the Berlin Stock Exchange. Kim Gran has been the President and chief executive officer since 1 September 2000, having previously served as a vice president for five years.

Products

Passenger car tyres
Nokian Tyres produces tyres for passenger cars, SUVs, and vans. Nokian branded tyres are sold in over 60 countries. Nokian Tyres designed the first winter tyres in 1934 and has more winter tyre patents than any other manufacturer. Nokian Tyres is known for its winter tyres, not to be confused with all-season tyres. Nokian winter tyres have been described as a favourite of critics and have been well received in winter test results by several publications. Nokian also has designed some winter tyre models with low rolling resistance, offering lower fuel consumption. Nokian was the first company to produce a tyre that allowed for year-round use by having different tread patterns on the lateral and medial aspect of the tread. One pattern is optimised for winter and another pattern is designed as an all-season pattern.

Nokian Tyres was the first tyre manufacturer in the world to eliminate high-aromatic oils from its production process. Used as plasticising agents in tread production and to facilitate the compounding of rubber, they contain polycyclic aromatic hydrocarbons (PAHs), a carcinogen, and have been replaced by low-aromatic oils. In 2006, Nokian Tyres received a commendation in the Finnish round of the European Business Awards for the Environment.

The demand for Nokian tyres is seasonal, as a high percentage of the company's sales are of winter tyres, but it has reduced seasonal fluctuations by its development of summer and all weather tyres. According to the company, more than 80% of its passenger car and van tyre sales are winter tyres. Winter tyre sales have a strong seasonal characteristic with 30% of retail sales occurring in the ten days after the first snowfall, thus presenting challenges in production and delivery.

Nokian Tyres does not sell to automobile manufacturers, but instead concentrates on the more profitable consumer tyre replacement and premium snow tyre markets. Nokian Tyres has the highest market share of the Finnish passenger car tyre market. The Finnish, Swedish, and Norwegian markets contributed over 40% of Nokian Tyres' corporate net sales in 2008.

The Russian market, Nokian Tyres' largest, contributed 34% of the net sales and captured 26% of the Russian winter tyre market. CEO Kim Gran describes the Russian consumer as having a "love affair" with the Nokian brand citing that it stems from tyres which suit the local weather conditions and a genuine need in the market. The use of winter tyres, which have softer rubber compounds than all-season tyres, results in improved starting, stopping, and steering performance. The Hakkapeliitta brand was, at one time, the only Western tyre brand in Russia having entered the market during the Soviet era in 1964. In contrast to having a Russian tyre factory to benefit from lower tariffs, another tyre company, Continental AG, abandoned Russian tyre production and hopes for Russian membership in the World Trade Organisation will result in lower import tariffs.

In 2009, the North American market accounted for over 10% of the company's net sales. Nokian Tyres has a tyre subsidiary based in LaVergne, Tennessee (USA). In that market, Nokian Tyres sell only to independent dealers, some of whom use the tyre products to fill in gaps in their product lines instead of an exclusive or majority share. This results in some dealers being knowledgeable about specific tyres but not Nokian Tyre's full tyre product range.

Commercial vehicle tyres
Nokian Tyres manufactures truck and bus tyres sold under the Nokian Hakkapeliitta brand. Steer, traction, and trailer tyres are marketed. Nokian Heavy Tyres Ltd is a manufacturer of special tyres for forestry, industrial machinery, and agriculture. Its products are sold as original equipment as well on the replacement tyre market. Nokian Tyres produces a number of product lines, including the Tractor Industrial 2 and Country King. Nokian Tyres is a world market leader in forestry tyres, which are a key product of the Nokian Heavy Tyres subsidiary. Nokian forestry tyres include the Skidder and Cut-To-Length model lines. The Skidder tyres have a 25 degree bar angle and the Cut-To-Length tyres have a 35 degree bar angle. Bar angle is a tyre tread measurement. Smaller bar angles are associated with higher traction at the expense of increased mud accumulation.

Tyre-related products
Nokian Tyres also produces materials for retreading and refurbishing used tyres. Nokian Noktop and Kraiburg, an industry competitor, produce most of the retreading materials for the European market. The RoadSnoop Pressure Watch, a tyre pressure monitor for race cars, is also produced by Nokian Tyres.

Bicycle

The Nokian brand of bicycle tyres, including studded winter MTB and touring models was later owned and produced by Suomen Rengastehdas (Finnish Tyrefactory Ltd) until spring of 2019. 
Beginning from 18 September 2019 LieksaTyres Oy now continues the bicycle tire development and manufacturing at its factory in Lieksa with Suomi Tyres brand name using the original toolings and production lines ones started by Nokia Corporation in 1974.

Vianor tyre chain

Nokian Tyres owns 100% of Vianor Holding Oy, which administers Vianor, a tyre chain of company owned and franchised stores. The Vianor name is derived from the Latin phrase "northern way" or "northern road", and reflects the tyre chain's image as a tyre specialist for winter conditions.

Vianor is the largest and most extensive tyre franchise in the Nordic countries with approximately 170 company-owned retail outlets and around 800 outlets in total including franchises. Company-owned outlets are located in the Switzerland, Russia, Norway, Finland, Sweden, and the United States. The twelve United States outlets are located in the American states of Vermont, New Hampshire, New York and Massachusetts. Countries with only franchised outlets include Ukraine, Estonia, Latvia, Lithuania, Kazakhstan, Armenia, Moldova, Georgia, Belarus, Poland, Germany, Czech Republic, Romania, Slovakia and Bulgaria.

Nokian Tyres has operated retail tyre stores in Norway since 1987, when it acquired Larsen & Lund, and since 1998 in Sweden and Latvia. The Vianor name was launched in 1999 coinciding with the company's expansion into Finland and Estonia.

Vianor sells two million tyres annually, including Michelin and Bridgestone brands as well as Nokian tyres. Car servicing and a tyre hotel, facilities for customers to store summer or winter tyres during the off-season, are also offered.

Tyre facilities

Nokia, Finland production and testing facilities

Nokian Tyres produces 23,000 tyres per day at a factory in Nokia, Finland, and 200,000 tyres a year under the Bridgestone brand name. The original factory was built in 1904, the current one in 1945; it has expanded several times since then. Nokian Tyres has 27 assembly lines at its Finnish plant. The plant uses radio frequency devices to monitor the inventory of materials used to manufacture tyres, such as the 100-metre long strips of rubber tread. Shortages of rubber tread can halt production and so keeping an adequate supply of materials increases efficiency. Despite trade journals discussing this technique, Nokian declines to confirm its production methods.

The company has a  testing facility in Nokia, where it road tests tyres between April and November. From November to May, tests are carried out at its Ivalo Proving Grounds in Arctic Lapland. The Ivalo Proving Ground is the only permanent winter tyre testing facility in the world. Because of the short summer in Finland, Nokian tests summer tyres at other locations. During the winter, the testing of summer tyres takes place in South Africa. Nokian also tests tyres at the Applus+ IDIADA facilities in El Vendrell, Spain, and the ATP facilities in Papenburg, Germany.

Vsevolozhsk, Russia factory
Nokian produces approximately 6,000 tyres daily and employs 510 employees at its factory in Vsevolozhsk, Russia near Saint Petersburg, and plans to increase manufacturing capacity to 10 million tyres annually by 2011. The factory was established in 2005. In 2006, it expanded its facilities there, adding a mixing department and a  warehouse capable of housing 600,000 tyres. The new mixing department gives the factory the capability to produce rubber compounds on-site instead of importing them from the factory in Nokia, Finland. The Vsevolozhsk factory manufactures Nokian-branded car tyres, in 2006 the majority of which were sold in Russia and countries of the former USSR. Nokian plans to build 300 housing units and sell them to employees at cost as part of the Russian factory expansion that was scheduled to be completed by 2011.

During the Russian 2014-2017 financial crisis, the company moved to exporting 70 percent of all of its Russian tire production, up from about 55 percent, as manufacturing costs in the country lowered. In 2017, as the Russian economy began to recover, Nokian began redirecting production back to Russian customers and invested 55 million euros in upgrading the factory, including an increase in annual production capacity from 15.5 million tyres to 17 million.

Dayton Tennessee, United States factory 

In May 2017, Nokian announced the construction of a new factory in Dayton, Tennessee, with an annual production capacity of 4 million tyres. The facility would employ about 400 people, cost €330 million to build, and expected to start production by 2020. In addition to producing tires, the facility would house an on-site distribution facility with a storage capacity of 600,000 units. The company expects to double its North American sales by 2023. Nokian began hiring workers for the plant in February 2019, and sent its first group of employees for training to its Finnish and Russian factories in May 2019. The Dayton plant officially opened on 2 October 2019. The company plans to have up to 150 employees by the end of the year.

Contract production of tyres
Nokian Tyres licenses production of its tyres to companies in the United States (Bridgestone's LaVergne, Tennessee, plant), Slovakia (Matador, Puchov, plant), Indonesia (PT Gajah Tunggal Tbk company), and the People's Republic of China (Giti Tire), as well as contract manufacture of agriculture and industrial tyres in Spain and India. In the past, some United States contract manufacturing was done by Cooper Tire's Findlay, Ohio, plant. Contract manufacture by Giti Tire includes production of up to 500,000 Nokian summer tyres with expansion up to 1.5 million tyres per year. Some Nokian agricultural and industrial tyres were made under contract by the Tofan Grup in Romania for two years until December 1999, when Nokian Tyres withdrew, citing quality standards. Contract manufacture of these types of heavy tyres was then undertaken by Michelin at its Polish plant, Stomil-Olsztyn, from 2000 until 2005, when Nokian began to shift contract manufacture of industrial tyres to Bridgestone's factory in Bilbao, Spain and agricultural tyres to Balkrishna Tyres in Bhiwadi, India.

References

External links

 
 
 
Kauppalehti: Finnish tire firm manipulated test results YLE, 2016

Manufacturing companies established in 1988
Companies listed on Nasdaq Helsinki
Finnish brands
Tire manufacturers of Finland
Cycle parts manufacturers